The United States Air Force's 48th Intelligence Support Squadron is an intelligence support unit located at Beale AFB, California. The squadron is associated with Lockheed U-2 operations.

Mission
The 48th Information Support Squadron provides in-garrison and deployed communications and logistics maintenance for the DGS-2 and Deployable Shelterized System-Film (DSS-F) elements of the AN/GSQ-272 SENTINEL (also known as Distributed Common Ground System, or DCGS). The unit also ensures multisource intelligence from U-2, MQ-1 Predator, General Atomics MQ-9 Reaper, and Global Hawk aircraft is exploited in real-time and sent to combatant commanders and warfighting forces.

Lineage
 Designated as the 6948 Security Squadron (Mobile) and organized on 1 July 1963
 Redesignated 6948th Electronic Security Squadron on 1 August 1979
 Redesignated 48th Intelligence Squadron on 1 October 1993
 Inactivated on 30 September 1994
 Activated on 30 November 1994
 Redesignated 48th Intelligence Support Squadron on 1 July 2022

Assignments
 6940th Security Wing, 1 July 1963
 6955th Security Group, 1 July 1974
 United States Air Force Security Service (later Electronic Security Command), 15 May 1975
 6960th Electronic Security Wing (later Continental Electronic Security Division), 1 July 1980
 695th Electronic Security Wing, 3 October 1988
 Continental Electronic Security Division, 1 January 1991
 693d Intelligence Wing, 1 October 1991
 67th Intelligence Group, 1 October 1993 – 30 September 1994
 67th Intelligence Group, 30 November 1994
 480th Intelligence Group, 31 January 2000
 548th Intelligence Group (later 548th Intelligence, Surveillance and Reconnaissance Group), 1 December 2003 – present

Stations
 Goodfellow Air Force Base, Texas, 1 July 1963
 Kelly Air Force Base, Texas, 1 August 1973 – 30 September 1994
 Beale Air Force Base, California, 30 November 1994 – present)

Decorations
Air Force Outstanding Unit Award
1 Sep 1991 – 30 Jun 1993
1 Jul 1993 – 30 Jun 1994
1 Jul 1994 – 30 Jun 1995
1 Jun 1996 – 31 May 1998

References

Notes
 Explanatory notes

 Citations

Bibliography

Air Force Historical Research Agency: 9th Intelligence Squadron

Military units and formations in California
0048